Joyeux Noel means Merry Christmas in French. For other uses, see Christmas (disambiguation) and Merry Christmas (disambiguation)
Joyeux Noël (English: Merry Christmas) is a 2005 war drama film based on the Christmas truce of December 1914, depicted through the eyes of French, British, and German soldiers. It was written and directed by Christian Carion, and screened out of competition at the 2005 Cannes Film Festival.

The film, which includes one of the last appearances of Ian Richardson before his death, was nominated for Best Foreign Language Film at the 78th Academy Awards. It is a fictionalised account of an actual event that took place in December 1914, when Wilhelm, German Crown Prince, sent the lead singer of the Berlin Imperial Opera company on a solo visit to the front line. Singing by the tenor, Walter Kirchhoff, to the 120th and 124th Württemberg regiments led French soldiers in their trenches to stand up and applaud.

Plot

The story centres mainly upon six characters: Gordon (a Lieutenant of the Royal Scots Fusiliers); Audebert (a French Lieutenant in the 26th Infantry and reluctant son of a general); Horstmayer (a Jewish German Lieutenant of the 93rd Infantry); Father Palmer (a Scottish priest working as a chaplain and stretcher-bearer); and two famous opera stars, German tenor Nikolaus Sprink - Walter Kirchoff - and his Danish fiancée, mezzo-soprano Anna Sørensen.

The film begins with scenes of schoolboys reciting patriotic speeches that both praise their countries and condemn their enemies. In Scotland, two young brothers, Jonathan and William, join up to fight, followed by their priest, Father Palmer, who becomes a chaplain. In Germany, Sprink is interrupted during a performance by a German officer announcing a reserve call up. French soldier Audebert looks at a photograph of his pregnant wife, whom he has had to leave behind (in the occupied part of France, just in front of his trench), and prepares to exit into the trenches for an Allied assault on German lines. However, the assault fails, with the French and British taking many casualties while William loses his life.

In Germany, Anna gets permission to perform for Crown Prince Wilhelm, and Sprink is allowed to accompany her. They spend a night together and then perform. Afterward, Sprink expresses bitterness at the comfort of the generals at their headquarters and resolves to go back to the front to sing for the troops. Sprink initially opposes Anna's decision to go with him, but he agrees shortly afterward.

The unofficial truce begins when the British begin to sing festive songs and songs from home, accompanied by bagpipes. Sprink and Sørensen arrive on the German front line, and Sprink sings for his comrades. As Sprink sings "Silent Night", he is accompanied by Father Palmer's bagpipes from the Scottish front line. Sprink responds to Palmer and exits his trench with a small Christmas tree, singing "Adeste Fideles". Following Sprink's lead Audebert, Horstmayer, and Gordon meet in no-man's-land and agree on a cease-fire for the evening.

The various soldiers meet and wish each other "Joyeux Noël", "Frohe Weihnachten", and "Merry Christmas". They exchange chocolate, champagne, and photographs of loved ones. Horstmayer gives Audebert back his wallet containing a photograph of his wife, which was lost in the attack a few days prior, and they connect over pre-war memories. Father Palmer celebrates a brief Mass for the soldiers (in Latin as was the practice in the Catholic Church at that time), and the soldiers retire deeply moved. However, Jonathan remains totally unmoved by the events around him, choosing to grieve for his brother. The following morning, the Lieutenants agree to extend the truce to allow each side to bury their dead, followed by cordial fraternisation for the rest of the day. As their soldiers play football, Audebert and Horstmayer sympathise, speaking in French of their memories of Paris and Lens, and their families. Horstmayer offers to take a letter to Lens for Audebert's wife. The next day, as the German forces shell the Allied position, Horstmayer offers to shelter the French and British soldiers in his trench, an offer Audebert and Gordon return to protect the Germans from their own retaliatory bombing. Before parting, aware that the truce has now truly ended, Audebert and Horstmayer lament that they cannot be friends, and hope that they both survive the war. As Audebert compliments Horstmayer on his French, the German reveals that his wife is French.

Prior to the bombing, Horstmayer learns that Anna and Sprink left without the German superior's assent to entertain fellow front soldiers and informs both that Sprink is going to be arrested for disobedience. As the Germans regain their trenches, Anna and Sprink remain behind and ask Audebert to take them as captives, in order to avoid separation. Letters that they hand over to him from the German soldiers (who had been hoping Anna would deliver them when she returned to Berlin), as well as letters from soldiers all across the front, are intercepted by military authorities, revealing that the truce had occurred.

Father Palmer is being sent back to his own parish and his battalion is disbanded as a mark of shame. Despite emphasising the humanity and goodwill of the truce, he is rebuked by the bishop, who then preaches an anti-German sermon to new recruits, in which he describes the Germans as inhumane and commands the recruits to kill every one of them. Father Palmer overhears the sermon and removes his cross as he leaves.

Back in the trenches, the British are ordered by a furious major (who is angered by the truce) to shoot a German soldier who is entering no-man's-land and crossing towards French lines. All of the soldiers deliberately miss in response, except the bitter Jonathan, who shoots the targeted German soldier. Audebert, hearing the familiar alarm clock ringing outside, rushes out and discovers that the soldier is a disguised Ponchel, his batman. With his dying words, Ponchel reveals he gained help from the German soldiers, visited his mother, and had coffee with her. He also informs Audebert that he has a young son named Henri.

Audebert is punished by being sent to Verdun, and he receives a dressing down from his father, a general. In a culminating rant, young Audebert upbraids his father, expressing no remorse at the fraternisation at the front, and his disgust for civilians and superiors who talk of sacrifice but know nothing of the struggle in the trenches. He also informs the general about his new grandson Henri. Moved by this revelation, the general then recommends they "both try and survive this war for him".

Horstmayer and his troops, who are confined in a train, are informed by the German Crown Prince that they are to be shipped to the Eastern Front, without permission to see their families as they pass through Germany. He then stomps on Jörg's harmonica and says that Horstmayer does not deserve his Iron Cross. As the train departs, the Germans start humming a British carol they learnt from the British, "L'Hymne des Fraternisés/ I'm Dreaming of Home".

Cast
 Benno Fürmann (singing voice: Rolando Villazón) as Private Nikolaus Sprink (German tenor) real name Walter Kirchhoff (Berlín;1879 — Wiesbaden; 1951) 
 Guillaume Canet as Lieutenant Camille René Audebert (French 26th Infantry Regiment)
 Diane Kruger (singing voice: Natalie Dessay) as Anna Sørensen (Danish soprano, Sprink's wife)
 Gary Lewis as Father Palmer (British priest and stretcher-bearer)
 Alex Ferns as Lieutenant Gordon (Scots Fusiliers)
 Dany Boon as Private Ponchel (Audebert's batman)
 Daniel Brühl as Leutnant (Lieutenant) Horstmayer (German 93rd Infantry Regiment)
 Christian Carion as British Medical Orderly
 Christopher Fulford as Royal Scots Fusiliers Major
 Mathias Herrmann as German Officer at Headquarters
 Neil McNulty as British Soldier
 Lucas Belvaux as Gueusselin
 Steven Robertson as Jonathan
 Suzanne Flon as The Chatelaine
 Bernard Le Coq as Général
 Ian Richardson as the Bishop
 Thomas Schmauser as the Crown Prince

Development and production
Carion's youth was spent in his parents' farm fields in Northern France, where he was constantly reminded of World War I as the family often found dangerous unexploded shells left over from the conflicts in the fields. He had also heard of the stories in which French soldiers would leave their trenches at night to meet with their wives in the surrounding German-occupied towns and return to fight the next morning. Carion stated that he'd never heard of the actual Christmas truce incidents while growing up in France, as the French Army and authorities suppressed them, having been viewed as an act of disobedience. He was introduced to the stories via a historian who showed him photos and documents archived in France, the United Kingdom, and Germany, and became fascinated. He tried to portray all of the soldiers with equal sympathy, as "the people on the frontline can understand each other because they are living the same life and suffering the same way", so he could understand how the truce could have come about. He endeavored to stay true to the real stories, but one of the things he had to change was the fate of the cat that crossed into various trenches. In reality, the cat was accused of spying, arrested by the French Army and then shot by a firing squad, as an actual traitor would have been. The extras in the movie refused to participate in this scene, so it was amended to have the cat imprisoned.

Critical reception
Joyeux Noël has an approval rating of 74% on review aggregator website Rotten Tomatoes, based on 112 reviews, and an average rating of 6.77/10.The website's critical consensus states, "The poignant humanity on display in Joyeux Noël makes its sentimentality forgivable". Metacritic assigned the film a weighted average score of 70 out of 100, based on 26 critics, indicating "generally favorable reviews".

Stephen Holden, film critic for The New York Times, liked the motion picture and wrote, "If the film's sentiments about the madness of war are impeccably high-minded, why then does Joyeux Noël ...feel as squishy and vague as a handsome greeting card declaring peace on earth? Maybe it's because the kind of wars being fought in the 21st century involve religious, ideological and economic differences that go much deeper and feel more resistant to resolution than the European territorial disputes and power struggles that precipitated World War I... Another reason is that the movie's cross-section of soldiers from France, Scotland and Germany are so scrupulously depicted as equal-opportunity peacemakers that they never come fully to life as individuals."

Critic Roger Ebert also wrote about the sentimentality of the film, "Joyeux Noël has its share of bloodshed, especially in a deadly early charge, but the movie is about a respite from carnage, and it lacks the brutal details of films like Paths of Glory ...Its sentimentality is muted by the thought that this moment of peace actually did take place, among men who were punished for it, and who mostly died soon enough afterward. But on one Christmas, they were able to express what has been called, perhaps too optimistically, the brotherhood of man."

Adaptations

Kevin Puts' 2011 opera Silent Night is based on the Joyeux Noël screenplay.

Soundtrack
 "Ave Maria", performed by Natalie Dessay, The London Symphony Orchestra
 "Bist du bei mir", performed by Natalie Dessay and Rolando Villazón
 "I'm Dreaming of Home", performed by Griogair Lawrie, David Bruce, Ivan MacDonald and Calum Anthony Beaton (Bagpipe Ensemble)
 "The Braes of Killiecrankie", traditional
  Piobaireachd – "The Cloth of Gold", traditional
 "Piobaireachd of Donald Dubh", traditional
 "Silent Night"
 "Adeste Fideles", traditional, performed by Rolando Villazón (vocals), Griogair Lawrie (bagpipes)
 "Auld Lang Syne", Scottish traditional
 "L'Hymne des Fraternisés/I'm Dreaming of Home", performed by Scala & Kolacny Brothers, Natalie Dessay, The London Symphony Orchestra

Awards

See also
 List of Christmas films

References

External links

 
 
 
 
 
 Construction of a monument in France 

2005 films
2000s war drama films
Belgian war drama films
British war drama films
French war drama films
French Christmas drama films
German Christmas drama films
German war drama films
Romanian war drama films
2000s English-language films
English-language French films
English-language German films
English-language Romanian films
2000s French-language films
2000s German-language films
Anti-war films about World War I
Western Front (World War I) films
World War I films based on actual events
Films directed by Christian Carion
Films set in 1914
Films set in France
Films set in Scotland
Films set in Germany
Sony Pictures Classics films
Christmas truce
Films adapted into operas
2000s Christmas drama films
British Christmas drama films
2005 drama films
French-language Belgian films
2000s British films
2000s French films
2000s German films
Films about the British Army
French-language German films
Romanian World War I films
Christmas war films